The 1996 Norwegian Football Cup Final was the final match of the 1996 Norwegian Football Cup, the 91st season of the Norwegian Football Cup, the premier Norwegian football cup competition organized by the Football Association of Norway (NFF). The match was played on 27 October 1996 at the Ullevaal Stadion in Oslo, and opposed two Tippeligaen sides and the Northern Norway teams Tromsø and Bodø/Glimt. Tromsø defeated Bodø/Glimt 3–1 to claim the Norwegian Cup for a second time in their history.

Match

Details

References

1996
Football Cup
Tromsø IL matches
FK Bodø/Glimt matches
Sports competitions in Oslo
1990s in Oslo
October 1996 sports events in Europe